Admiral  Travis Jeremy Liyanduru Sinniah, WWV, RWP, RSP, USP, ndu, psc was a Sri Lankan admiral and the 21st Commander of the Sri Lanka Navy. He has served as the Commander of Sri Lanka's Eastern Naval Area and as Flag Officer Commanding the Naval Fleet. He was the second Tamil to be appointed the commander of the Sri Lankan Navy after Rajan Kadiragamar in the 1960s.

Education
Born in Kandy, Sinniah was educated at Trinity College, Kandy. He joined the Sri Lanka Navy as a Cadet in 1982, undergoing basic training at the Naval and Maritime Academy and at the Britannia Royal Naval College graduating in 1986. He has attended the Defence Services Staff College gaining a Master of Science degree in Defence and Strategic Studies. He also holds a Diploma in International Studies. He is a Counter Terrorism Fellow (CTF) and a distinguished graduate of the National Defense University.

Career
Having commissioned as a Sub-lieutenant, Sinniah went on to gain several sea commands on many vessels. Having served with the 4th Fast Attack Flotilla as a Squadron Commander and subsequently as its Commanding Officer. During the Sri Lankan Civil War he led the Naval Task Force in the destruction of LTTE arms smuggling ships over a period of two years. He has 37 LTTE hits under his command, and counts over 70 hits by the fleet during his tenure as Commander of the Fast Attack Flotilla. Vice Admiral Sinniah was the officer who apprehended the infamous LTTE ship "Kadalpura" with 19 Black Sea Tigers on board, including the LTTE second-in-command and 9 LTTE leaders, a significant milestone in the course of the war. He was the Captain of the flag ship of the Sri Lanka Navy in 2007 and served as Flag Officer Commanding Naval Fleet, The Commandant Naval and Maritime Academy, Deputy Area Commander East and The Commandant Volunteer Naval Force. He held several staff appointments in the Naval Headquarters as Personal Assistant to the Commander of the Navy; Director Naval Projects and Plans and R&D; Deputy Director Naval Administration; Staff officer Projects and Plans; Senior Staff Officer Research and Development. Served as Deputy Area Commander East North and North West Commands.

Breaking with convention, President Maithripala Sirisena extended Sinniah's service period as Commander by just one month, resulting in Sinniah's retirement on his 55th birthday, on 26 October 2017. This was due to Sinniah opposing the purchase of a ship for twice its value and exposing corruption by the then government and defense secretary.

His decorations include  Weera Wickrama Vibhushanaya , Rana Wickrama Padakkama, Rana Sura Padakkama trice for gallantry; Vishista Seva Vibhushanaya and Uttama Seva Padakkama for meritorious service, the Fast Attack Craft (FAC) Squadron Pin and the Surface Warfare Badge.

References

Commanders of the Navy (Sri Lanka)
Sri Lankan admirals
Alumni of Trinity College, Kandy
Living people
Sri Lankan Tamil military personnel
Date of birth missing (living people)
Graduates of Britannia Royal Naval College
Year of birth missing (living people)
Defence Services Staff College alumni